Hangman's Curse is a 2001 novel by Frank E. Peretti.  It is the first book in the Veritas Project series for teenagers.

Plot overview
The story centers around an apparently supernatural case taken by a family of investigators who make up the Veritas Project. About seventy years after the suicidal hanging of Abel Frye, a student at a high school who hanged himself after being unable to cope with the pressures of bullying, Jocks from the school's football team begin to lose their sanity after seeing what they believe to be Abel's ghost, which is rumored to be under the control of a group of witches out for revenge. Abel's ghost makes them go into a coma like feeling.

Plot summary
After successfully initiating a drug bust,  Nate and Sarah Springfield and their teenage children, Elijah and Elisha, are handpicked to investigate an outbreak of strange occurrences in an otherwise typical high school.  Elijah and Elisha become students at the school and quickly make names for themselves when they debate their teachers on the lesson plans regarding humanism and evolution while their father confronts the tolerated bullying in the school.

After several of the football players are injected, Elijah and Elisha quickly learn that a group of gothic cult members have been blamed for the plague; they were bullied as Abel was, and it is believed that the curse is their means of revenge.  The assumed leader of the group, Ian Snyder, takes credit at first, but his followers turn on him when he "loses control" of the ghost of Abel; his friend, and a few classmates each die after having hallucinations.  Ian drops out of the cult and turns to Elijah for spiritual help.

Later, Sarah discovers straws filled with a sugar-like substance in the lockers of the stricken students, their dog, Max, recognizes the scent all over the school.  An eccentric scientist named Algernon Wheeling is called into the investigation, and determines that the sugar is actually to keep a male poisonous cross-breed of the African Spotted wolf spider and brown recluse in the straw till he smells the female pheromone on the victim because of the dollar bill, he eats his way out and bites the victim after being agitated at not finding the female. The spiders were trapped in the straws, and the pheromone was spread through dollar bills, that circulated around the school to attract the spiders to the intended victims, who hallucinated and were later hospitalized after being bitten.  However, as the dollars were spread around the school, unintended sympathizers of the cult were bitten and suffered from the poison.  The mastermind of the entire project, a boy named Norman Bloom, led the cult and allowed them to believe that witches were responsible (Ian Snyder and some others).

Due to unbelievably fast reproduction, the school is overrun by the deadly spiders, and, as the school is evacuated, Elisha finds herself trapped under the school and bitten repeatedly, but is saved by Algernon Wheeling's antidote AT490.  The hospitalized students recover, and the case is declared closed.

Film adaptation
Hangman's Curse (film), a film based on Hangman's Curse, was released in 2003. It stars David Keith as Nate, Mel Harris as Sarah, Leighton Meester as Elisha, and Douglas Smith as Elijah. The movie was filmed largely at John R. Rogers High School in Spokane, Washington. The movie differed greatly from the book, leaving out key scenes and turning the character of Crystal into a main character as Ian Snyder's girlfriend.

External links

 Entry in FrankPeretti.com
 Unofficial Forum for the Book, Movie, and Author
 Official website of the film adaptation

2001 American novels
2001 fantasy novels
American young adult novels
Novels by Frank E. Peretti
American fantasy novels adapted into films
American Christian novels
Novels set in high schools and secondary schools